Transmembrane Protein 205 (TMEM205) is a protein encoded on chromosome 19 by the TMEM205 gene.

Gene 
TMEM205 is located on the minus strand of chromosome 19 from base pair 11,453,452 to 11,456,981. In close proximity to TMEM205, CCDC159 is located slightly upstream and RAB3D slightly down stream of the genomic sequence.

Homology 
TMEM205 has no known Paralogs  in the Human genome. Using UCSC genome browser BLAT  against the human protein sequence it was found that the closest relative to humans to contain a paralog of the TMEM205 gene in its genome is the Bushbaby. TMEM205 does however have a large range of ortholog sequences.

Protein 
The human homologue of TMEM205 is 189 amino acids long and has a molecular weight of 21.2 kDa. It contains 4 hydrophobic helical domains that are predicted to be transmembrane domains.

Expression 
TMEM205 has been shown to be expressed in greater amounts in tissues that have secretory function. These tissues include the thyroid, adrenal gland, pancrease, and mammary tissues. The protein has also been shown to have increased expression in tumor tissue that have become resistant to platinum based chemotherapy drugs.

Function 
TMEM205 is thought to be a multi-pass transmembrane protein. It has been shown to be located at the plasma membrane in humans tissues and translocates to the nuclear envelope when cells become resistant to Cisplatin. It contains four domains predicted to be trans membrane domains by TMHMM analysis.

Interacting proteins
TMEM205 has been shown to be co-located with RAB8 a known GTPase involved in vesicular traffic.

Clinical significance
TMEM205 has been shown to be involved in Cisplatin resistance. Cisplatin is a chemotherapeutic drug that is commonly used to treat solid malignancies such as carcinomas, sarcomas, and lymphomas. In addition to being involved in Cisplatin resistance there is growing evidence that the protein is also involved in the diseases thyroiditis and prostatitis

Notes

Genes on human chromosome 19
Proteins